Hindu music is music created for or influenced by Hinduism. It includes Indian classical music, Kirtan, Bhajan and other musical genres. Raagas are a common form of Hindu music in classical India.

The most common Hindu bhajan in North India is "Om Jai Jagdish Hare." 
The  names of Gods are religiously chanted, often including Vishnu and his incarnations, Shiva and the Goddess (Parvati, Shakti, Vaishnodevi).

A very common scale in Hindu music is 1 2 3 4 5 6 7, which can be harmonized into a chord progression.

Bhajan

A bhajan is a Hindu devotional song, often of ancient origin. Bhajans are often simple songs in lyrical language expressing emotions of love for the Divine, whether for a single God and Goddess, or any number of divinities. Many bhajans feature several names and aspects of the chosen deity, especially in the case of Hindu sahasranamas, which list a divinity's 1008 names. Great importance is attributed to the singing of bhajans with Bhakti, i.e. loving devotion. "Rasanam Lakshanam Bhajanam" means the act by which we feel more closer to our inner self or God, is a bhajan. Acts which are done for the God is called bhajan.

Traditionally, the music has been Indian classical music, which is based on ragas and tala (rhythmic beat patterns) played on the Veena (or Been), Sarangi Venu (flute), Mridanga(or Tabla) (traditional Indian instruments). The Sikh Scripture contains 31 ragas and 17 talas which form the basis for kirtan music compositions.

Hindus are even said to have achieved Moksha through devoting music to God. For example, in the Rig Veda Gargi, the wife of Yajnavalkya, through her excellence in veena playing, an incident that caused Sage Yagnavalkya to write the famous verse:

"Veena Vadama Tatvagnaha

Sruthi Jathi Visharada

Talagnanacha Aprayasena

Mokshamargam Gachachathi"

("Yagnavalkya Siksha")

There have also been several music-saints (e.g. Sant Tyagaraja) and poet-saints (e.g. Sant Ravidas).

Kirtan

This is the communal, call-and-response chanting of mantras, often with instruments and dance. Kirtans are deeply rooted in Vedic tradition.

Indian classical music

The origins of Indian classical music can be found from the oldest of scriptures, part of the Hindu tradition, the Vedas. Samaveda, one of the four Vedas, describes music at length.

See also 

 Hindu art
 Music of India

References

 
Religion and the arts
Religious music